Paul Howe (born 8 January 1968) is a Singapore-born former competitive swimmer and freestyler.

Swimming career
He represented Great Britain in the Olympics and England in the Commonwealth Games.  He competed in three consecutive Olympic Games, starting at the 1984 Summer Olympics in Los Angeles, California.  There he claimed the bronze medal in the 4×200-metre freestyle relay, alongside teammates Neil Cochran, Paul Easter, and Andrew Astbury. He represented England and won a bronze medal in the 4 x 200 metres freestyle relay, at the 1986 Commonwealth Games in Edinburgh, Scotland. Four years later he represented England in the 200 metres freestyle and relay, at the 1990 Commonwealth Games in Auckland, New Zealand.

He is a three times winner of the ASA National British Championships in the 200 metres freestyle (1990-1992) and a three times winner of the 400 metres freestyle in 1988, 1990 and 1991. He also won the 200 metres butterfly title in 1990.

Personal
Howe attended Millfield School from 1983 to 1986.

See also
 List of Commonwealth Games medallists in swimming (men)
 List of Olympic medalists in swimming (men)

References

 British Olympic Association athlete profile

1965 births
Living people
English male freestyle swimmers
Swimmers at the 1984 Summer Olympics
Swimmers at the 1986 Commonwealth Games
Swimmers at the 1990 Commonwealth Games
Swimmers at the 1988 Summer Olympics
Swimmers at the 1992 Summer Olympics
Olympic swimmers of Great Britain
Olympic bronze medallists for Great Britain
Commonwealth Games bronze medallists for England
Place of birth missing (living people)
Olympic bronze medalists in swimming
Medalists at the 1984 Summer Olympics
Commonwealth Games medallists in swimming
People educated at Millfield
Medallists at the 1986 Commonwealth Games